Carolynne is a Swedish feminine given name that is an alternate form of Caroline as well as a diminutive form of Carola.  Notable people referred to by this name include the following:

Given name
Carolynne Cunningham (born 1964), Australian film producer director
Carolynne Poole (born 1980), English singer-songwriter
Carolynne Snowden (1900 – 1985), American actress, dancer, and singer

See also

Carolanne
Carolyne
Carolynn

Notes

Swedish feminine given names